Luis Alberto Cuevas Olmedo (born September 12, 1967), better known as Beto Cuevas, is a Chilean-Canadian singer, song writer, plastic artist, painter, and actor. He is the lead singer for the Chilean band La Ley. In 2008 he launched his solo career with the release of his album, Miedo Escénico. In 2012 he released his second album called Transformación.

Music career

1988–2004: La Ley

In 1988, during a trip to Concón, Chile, Beto met Mauricio Clavería, drummer for La Ley. Clavería invited Cuevas to join the band, which had just lost two founding members, Iván Delgado and Shía Arbulú. Beto made his debut as La Ley's singer on their first album, Desiertos, quickly becoming the voice of the band. La Ley soon released their second album, Doble Opuesto.

During the early years of the band, Cuevas only wrote the lyrics to the songs, as the writing of the music was done by the band's founder and leader Andrés Bobe. During this time, La Ley became one of the most successful groups in the country. In 1994 Bobe died in a motorcycle accident after a benefit show, which forced Beto to become the leader of the group. He went from being the visible face of the group to becoming the main creative force behind it with the help of his bandmates.

La Ley's story is divided in two: before and after Andrés Bobe. Beto's influence after the passing of Andres is enormous. The group takes on a musical shift that pushes its success all over Latin America.

During the shoots for the music videos of the Invisible (1995) album, Beto begins exploring the seventh art, co-directing the pieces.

Many expert credit his years in North America as the main influence of La Ley's sound, which is unique among Chilean and Latin bands.

As the band's success grew abroad, it decreased in Chile, which bothered members of the group. They were presented in many Chilean TV and radio shows as the "Mexican" group, La Ley.

February 21, 2001, a day before the Viña del Mar Festival, the band was in the Channel 13 show, La Movida del Festival. While being interviewed live, a member of the audience announces the group just won a Grammy as best alternative rock group. This moment and the show at the Quinta Vergara on the day after, mark the turning point in which La Ley begins to regain recognition in their own country.

In mid-2001, the group records their MTV Unplugged, which becomes a huge success all over Latin America, but the most important thing for the members of the band, is that La Ley is finally recognized as the most important Chilean band of all time, thanks to the Grammy, their show at the Viña del Mar festival, and the new acoustic album.

2005–2009: Solo work
In 2005, Beto Cuevas, Pedro Frugone and Mauricio Clavería decide to take a break from La Ley.

Beto worked in small projects, including the song "Loud", in collaboration with Masters at Work ("Little Louie" Vega & Kenny "Dope" Gonzalez"). He revisited the song "Mentira", originally released in La Ley MTV Unplugged, and was a part of the soundtrack for the film, La mujer de mi hermano.

Other projects include the collaboration with Chilean band Los Prisioneros, in their album Manzana, in which Beto played synthesizers, guitars, and vocals in the song "Insatisfacción", a rendition of the Rolling Stones classic "(I Can't Get No) Satisfaction", and in "Eres Mi Hogar".

In 2007, he shot an episode of the Canal Fox Latinoamérica series Tiempo Final, titled "The Autograph", where he plays a character called Beto.

In September 2008, Beto was invited to interview Morrissey for a channel a friend of his owns in Los Angeles named LATV.

In March 2008 pre-launches his solo debut. At this time, it has been over two years since he last performed with La Ley.

Prior to the release of his first solo album, and the big stages, he does a more intimate tour throughout the US, sponsored by Jack Daniel's.

His debut solo album, Miedo Escénico was released on September 23, 2008, and it spun 3 hit singles: "Vuelvo", "Háblame", and "Un Minuto de Silencio".

On November 30, during the closing of the Teleton 2008 in Chile, he made a short but intense presentation.

On September 8 he recorded a version of the George Michael classic Faith, in the Buenos Aires soundstage of La 100 (99.9 fm). The song is featured on the album, La 100 en Vivo.

2010– Present

On February 26, 2010, he shared the stage with Raphael at the Viña del Mar Festival, where he was to perform solo the next day, until the earthquake on February 27 hit the south of Chile, and forced the rest of the Festival to be cancelled.

In May 2010, Beto released a version of the Violeta Parra classic, Gracias a la Vida, produced by Humberto Gatica, and featuring stars like Miguel Bosé, Michael Bublé, Fher Olvera, Juan Luis Guerra, Shakira, Laura Pausini and Alejandro Sanz. 100% of the profits of the single will go toward helping in the recovery and the support of all the Chileans affected by the earthquake.

On September 25, 2012, he released his album Transformación, which features 12 songs and some collaborations with stars like Leire Martínez in "Goodbye". The album was recorded entirely in the US and charter in Billboard right away.

Beto was also chosen as one of the coaches in the second season of talent show La Voz... México, along with Paulina Rubio, Jenni Rivera and Miguel Bosé.

In 2014, La Ley finally reunited after nine years of their separation, embarking on a new tour.

Beto played the lead role of Jesus Christ in the 2019 all-star Mexican production of Jesus Christ Superstar.

Personal life
He was raised in Caracas, Venezuela and eventually grew up in Montreal, Quebec. He is fluent in French, English and Spanish. 

His family moved to Montreal, Quebec, Canada escaping Augusto Pinochet's dictatorship, so he also holds a Canadian passport. In 2002, he married model Estela Mora, but are currently separated. He has two children: Martina (born 1988) (from Estela's first marriage in Argentina) and Diego (born 1992). He was in a romantic relationship with actress Bárbara Mori for a year starting in May 2010.

Discography

Solo albums

Albums with La Ley

 1990: Desiertos
 1991: Doble Opuesto
 1993: La Ley
 1994: Cara de Dios
 1995: Invisible
 1998: Vértigo
 2000: Uno
 2001: La Ley MTV Unplugged
 2003: Libertad
 2004: Historias e Histeria
 2014: Retour
 2016: Adaptación

Film career
Cuevas portrayed the character Padre Santiago in the 2005 Mexican film La mujer de mi hermano (English: My brother's woman).

He played a bigger role as the character Santillan in the 2007 American film Borderland.

References

External links

The Official Beto Cuevas Site

1967 births
Chilean rock singers
20th-century Chilean male singers
Chilean singer-songwriters
Living people
Rock en Español musicians
Spanish-language singers of Canada
Warner Music Latina artists
Latin music songwriters
Rock songwriters
21st-century Chilean male singers
Chilean expatriates in Venezuela
Chilean emigrants to Canada
20th-century Chilean male artists